Don Camillo Filippo Ludovico Borghese, Prince of Sulmona and of Rossano, Duke and Prince of Guastalla (19 July 1775 – 9 May 1832) was a member of the Borghese family, best known for being a brother-in-law of Napoleon.

Borghese married Napoleon's younger sister, Pauline Bonaparte in 1803, which led to Napoleon gifting him multiple titles. After Napoleon's defeat, Borghese fled France and left his wife behind. Consequently, he was stripped of the titles granted to him by Napoleon, though he retained his family's ancestral titles.  While in Florence he died at the age of 56, the cause of death is unknown.

Biography
Camillo Borghese was born in Rome, the son of the pro-Napoleon Marcantonio Borghese, 5th Prince of Sulmona, and brother of Francesco (1776–1839), Prince Aldobrandini. He entered France's service in 1796. He became the second husband of Napoleon's sister Pauline Bonaparte in 1803 (after the death of her first husband, Charles Leclerc). 

Following his marriage, Camillo was made regimental chef of the Tirailleurs du Po which was recruited in the region which he governed.  He remained in this position until 24 January 1804 when he retired from military life.  Shortly after he was made a Prince of the French Empire and subsequently promoted to squadron chef in the Imperial Guard in 1805 (as an honorary rank).  On 10 February 1805 he was anointed with the Grand Eagle of the Legion of Honour.  On 27 December 1805 he was promoted to Colonel. He became the Duke of Guastalla in 1806, but this area was annexed by the Duchy of Parma shortly thereafter.

In 1807, the prince was forced to sell his art collection for around 3 million francs, which was held in the Abbey of Lucedio near Turin, which itself had an estimated worth of around 4 million francs.  His collection is now held at the Louvre in Paris.

On 14 May 1807 he was promoted to Brigade General, and on 23 January 1808 Divisional General.  In 1808 he was made overall military commander in Piedmont, and in 1809 this command was split into the 27th and 28th Military Divisions (Districts), now integrated into the French Imperial Army.  These divisions encompassed the regions of Piémont previously part of the Austrian Italian provinces.  Subsequently, he was made grand dignitary and governor general of Piedmont, overseeing the regions of Piedmont, Genoa, and Parma.

After 10 years there with a long-term mistress, he was reluctantly convinced by the pope into receiving Pauline back, only 3 months before she died of cancer. He then continued in secret and futile Bonapartist plots until his own death, which occurred at Florence 10 April 1832.

During his time as Prince of Sulmona and Rossana, Camillo was considered the richest Roman prince of his time.  His family was also heavily involved in the murder of General Duphot in 1798.

Footnotes

References

Borghese, Camillo
Borghese, Camillo
18th-century Italian people
Italian military personnel of the Napoleonic Wars
Camillo
Borghese, Camillo
Borghese, Camillo
Borghese, Camillo
Knights of the Golden Fleece of Spain
Nobility from Rome